Monkman Falls is a waterfall on Monkman Creek in the Northern Rockies of British Columbia, Canada.  It is one of a series of ten waterfalls on Monkman Creek known as "the Cascades".  It is named for Alexander Monkman, a fur trader then based in the Peace River Country who discovered Monkman Pass.

See also
List of waterfalls in Canada
Kinuseo Falls

References

Waterfalls of British Columbia
Canadian Rockies
Northern Interior of British Columbia
Peace River Land District